Zapotecanillus is a genus of ground beetles in the family Carabidae. There are about eight described species in Zapotecanillus.

Species
These eight species belong to the genus Zapotecanillus:
 Zapotecanillus iviei Sokolov, 2013
 Zapotecanillus ixtlanus Sokolov, 2013
 Zapotecanillus kavanaughi Sokolov, 2013
 Zapotecanillus longinoi Sokolov, 2013
 Zapotecanillus montanus Sokolov, 2013
 Zapotecanillus nanus Sokolov, 2013
 Zapotecanillus oaxacanus Sokolov, 2013
 Zapotecanillus pecki Sokolov, 2013

References

Trechinae